This is a list of the Australian moth species of the family Dudgeoneidae. It also acts as an index to the species articles and forms part of the full List of moths of Australia.

Dudgeonea actinias Turner, 1902
Dudgeonea lychnocycla Turner, 1945
Dudgeonea polyastra Turner, 1933

External links 
Dudgeoneidae at Australian Faunal Directory

Australia